At the end of each UEFA European Championship tournament, several awards are attributed to the players and teams which have distinguished from the rest, in different aspects of the game.

Awards
There are currently five post-tournament awards, and one given during the tournament:
 the Player of the Tournament for best player, first awarded in 1996;
 the Top Scorer Award (currently commercially termed Alipay Top Scorer Award) for most prolific goal scorer;
 the Young Player of the Tournament (currently commercially termed as SOCAR Young Player of the Tournament) for best under 21 years of age at the start of the calendar year, first awarded in 2016;
 the Man of the Match Award for outstanding performance during each game of the tournament, first awarded in 1996;
 the Team of the Tournament for best combined team of players at the tournament.

Player of the Tournament
The Player of the Tournament award is presented to the best player at each edition of the UEFA European Championship since 1996.

UEFA published on its website the Player of the Tournament in 1984, 1988 and 1992. The winners were Michel Platini, Marco van Basten and Peter Schmeichel, respectively. However, these winners are unofficial. 

Due to Schmeichel's award in 1992 being unofficial, Gianluigi Donnarumma was the first goalkeeper to officially win the award, at UEFA Euro 2020.

Top goalscorer

If there is more than one player with the same number of goals, since 2008 the tie-breaker goes to the player who has contributed the most assists. If there is still more than one player, the tie-breaker goes to the player who has played the least amount of time. Between the years 1960 and 2016, the Golden Boot award went to the top goalscorer of each edition of the UEFA European Championship. At Euro 2020, there was a new physical and digital trophy presented to the tournament's top scorer. It was commissioned by Alipay, the Chinese company sponsoring the award. "Sculpted in the shape of the Chinese character '支' (pronounced zhi, and meaning 'payment' as well as 'support'), the barefooted player on the trophy reflects the egalitarian footballing ideal that success on the pitch comes regardless of background or status," according to UEFA.

Young Player of the Tournament
The Young Player of the Tournament award is presented to the best player in the tournament who is at most 22 years old. For the UEFA Euro 2016, this meant that the player had to have been born on or after 1 January 1994. The award was first given out in 2016.

Man of the Match Award
The Man of the Match award picks the outstanding player in every game of the tournament since 1996.

Total awardsAs of 28 June 2021

Team of the Tournament
The Team of the Tournament is a team of the best performers at each respective UEFA European Championship edition, as chosen by the UEFA Technical Study Group since 1996. UEFA also retroactively named teams of the best 11 players from the 1960 to 1992 tournaments. The number of players in these squads has changed, from 18 players in 1996, 22 players in 2000, and 23 players from 2004 until 2012. Since 2016, a team of 11 players has been named.

All-time Euro XI

In June 2016, ahead of UEFA Euro 2016 in France, UEFA published an All-time Euro XI; the winning team was chosen based on votes cast on EURO2016.com and Twitter. The application featured the 11 players who have made the greatest impact at EURO final tournaments. Nominees had to meet at least two of the following four criteria:

 Appeared in at least a semi-final
 Featured in a Team of the Tournament
 Finished a EURO tournament as top scorer
 Produced an iconic EURO moment

Goalkeeper
  Gianluigi Buffon

Defenders
  Paolo Maldini
  Franz Beckenbauer
 Carles Puyol
  Philipp Lahm

Midfielders
  Andrés Iniesta
 Andrea Pirlo
  Zinedine Zidane

Forwards
  Cristiano Ronaldo
  Thierry Henry
  Marco van Basten

See also
 FIFA World Cup awards
 Copa América awards
 Africa Cup of Nations awards
 AFC Asian Cup awards
 CONCACAF Gold Cup awards
 OFC Nations Cup awards

References

Team
UEFA trophies and awards